The Vancouver Island Shootout was an annual curling bonspiel started in 2011 as part of the World Curling Tour. For the 2011–12 curling season, the event took place at the Juan de Fuca Curling Club in Colwood, British Columbia. The men's event was held in a triple knockout format, and the women's event was held in a round robin format. For the 2012–13 curling season and 2014–15 curling season, the event took place at the Victoria Curling Centre in Victoria, British Columbia, and both the men's and women's events were held in a triple knockout format.

Past Champions

Men

Women

References

External links
Juan de Fuca Curling Club Home Page

Former World Curling Tour events
Women's World Curling Tour events
Sports competitions in Victoria, British Columbia
Curling in British Columbia
Recurring sporting events established in 2011
2011 establishments in British Columbia
Recurring sporting events disestablished in 2014
2014 disestablishments in British Columbia